Lygistopterus is a genus of net-winged beetles in the family Lycidae. There are about 11 described species in Lygistopterus.

Species
These 11 species belong to the genus Lygistopterus:
 Lygistopterus bajacalifornicus Zaragoza-Caballero, 2003
 Lygistopterus chamelensis Zaragoza-Caballero, 2003
 Lygistopterus chiapensis Zaragoza-Caballero, 2003
 Lygistopterus chihuahuensis Zaragoza-Caballero, 2003
 Lygistopterus guerrerensis Zaragoza-Caballero, 2003
 Lygistopterus huautlaensis Zaragoza-Caballero, 2003
 Lygistopterus ignitus
 Lygistopterus jalisiensis Zaragoza-Caballero, 2003
 Lygistopterus morelensis Zaragoza-Caballero, 2003
 Lygistopterus rubripennis LeConte, 1875
 Lygistopterus sanguineus (Linnaeus, 1758)

References

Further reading

External links

 

Lycidae
Articles created by Qbugbot